("Seaweed") is the third studio album by Irish folk group Clannad. It was released in 1976. It is named for its first track, a rendition of the Irish folk song "Dúlamán".

Influence
Minneapolis Celtic-rock band Boiled in Lead was inspired to take its name from Clannad's version of Irish murder ballad "The Twa Sisters" as performed on this album as "Two Sisters."

Track listing
 "Dúlamán" – 4:34
 "Cumha Eoghain Rua Uí Néill" – 4:09
 "Two Sisters" – 4:13
 "Éirigh Suas a Stóirín" – 5:14
 "The Galtee Hunt" – 3:09
 "Éirigh Is Cuir Ort do Chuid Éadaigh" – 4:12
 "Siúil a Rúin" – 5:50
 "Mo Mháire" – 2:43
 "dTigeas a Damhsa" – 1:26
 "Cucanandy/The Jug of Brown Ale" – 3:13

Personnel

Band
 Ciarán Ó Braonáin – bass, guitar, keyboards, vocals, piano (electric), mandolin
 Máire Ní Bhronáin – vocals, harp
 Pól Ó Braonáin – flute, guitar, percussion, bongos, vocals, whistles, human whistle
 Noel Ó Dúgáin – guitar, vocals
 Pádraig Ó Dúgáin – guitar, mandola, mandolin, vocals

Additional musicians
 Nicky Ryan – backing vocals

Production
 Fritz Fryer – engineer
 Bill Giolando – mastering
 Nicky Ryan – producer
 Joachim Boske – sleeve design
 Bill Doyle – photography
 Manjit Jari – photography

Notes

1976 albums
Clannad albums
Albums recorded at Rockfield Studios